Devin Toner (born 29 June 1986) is a former professional rugby player. He played in the second-row for Ireland and the Irish province Leinster. Measuring 6' 10" in height, he was the tallest player in the Heineken Cup and the 2015 Rugby World Cup. He wore a size 15 (Ireland) boot.

Leinster
The former Castleknock College player established himself as a senior player with Leinster, chalking up more than a century of senior provincial caps. On 27 March 2021, he made his 262nd appearance for Leinster in a victory over Munster in the grand final of the 2020–21 Pro14, exceeding Gordon D'Arcy's provincial appearance record.

In March 2022, Toner announced that he would be retiring at the end of the 2021-22 season.

Ireland
Toner made his Ireland Wolfhounds debut in the 2009 Churchill Cup against Canada in June 2009, and helped his side win the tournament in Denver with a win against the England Saxons.	
	
Toner was selected by Ireland's head coach Declan Kidney to make his International debut for Ireland against Samoa on 13 November 2010 during the 2010 end of year rugby tests.	
He then came off the bench against the All Blacks and Argentina during the following week. Toner was a regular starter for Ireland at lock from 2013 to 2018.

Toner was left out of Joe Schmidt's squad for the 2019 Rugby World Cup, with Schmidt instead selecting Iain Henderson, Jean Kleyn, Tadhg Beirne and James Ryan as locks. Toner last appeared for Ireland in February 2020 in the Six Nations.

Honours

Leinster
European Rugby Champions Cup (4): 2009, 2011, 2012, 2018
Pro14 (7): 2008, 2013, 2014, 2018, 2019, 2020, 2021

Ireland A
Churchill Cup (1): 2009

Ireland
Six Nations Championship (3): 2014, 2015, 2018
Grand Slam (1): 2018

Individual
Leinster all-time caps leader: 280

References

External links
Ireland Profile
Leinster Profile
Pro14 Profile

ESPN Profile

1986 births
Living people
People educated at Castleknock College
Rugby union players from County Kildare
Irish rugby union players
Lansdowne Football Club players
Leinster Rugby players
Ireland international rugby union players
Rugby union locks